Josep Lluís Pellicer i Fenyé (12 May 1842 – 15 June 1901) was a Spanish painter, illustrator and cartoonist.

Biography 
He was born in Barcelona, and originally studied to be a surveyor, but switched to studying art with Ramón Martí Alsina, who later became his father-in-law. In 1865, he went to Rome to complete his studies. He combined his painting with drawings designed for publication by the press, including political cartoons, which were often signed with his pseudonym "Nyapus". 

In that regard, he was a supporter of Republican causes and, in 1869, his studio served as a meeting place for high-level organizers from the IWA; a meeting arranged by Pellicer's cousin, Rafael Farga i Pellicer, a prominent anarchist. That same year, he was elected as a City Councillor for Barcelona and was one of the signers of the Tortosa Pact.

His drawings also chronicled the Third Carlist War and, during the Russo-Turkish War, he was a correspondent for La Ilustración Española y Americana, L'Illustration and The Graphic. His work was highly detailed and was often done on the battlefield; sometimes on the front line. He also worked for Le Monde Illustré and L'Esquella de la Torratxa.

As a painter, he won medals during his stay in Rome and at the 1871 exposition in Madrid, where he presented his best-known painting, "Zitto, Silencio...que pasa la ronda" (Shut Up! Silence! The Patrol is Passing!). After helping to organize in the 1888 Barcelona Universal Exposition, he was named Director of the newly created "Museo de Reproducciones".

He was also one of the founders of the "Institut Català de les Arts del Llibre" (a society of illustrators) and twice served as its President.

He died in Barcelona.

References

Further reading 
 Salvador Bori, Tres maestros del lápiz de la Barcelona ochocentista, Padró, Planas, Pellicer, Millà 1945
 Glòria Escala i Romeu, Josep Lluís Pellicer: l'Impressionisme i la pintura realista a Catalunya in "Revista de Catalunya" #153 (2000); and Josep Lluís Pellicer, dibuixant in "L'Avenç" #267 (2002).

External links

 "José Luis Pellicer, corresponsal artístico en la última guerra carlista" by María Dolores Bastida de la Calle from Espacio, Tiempo y Forma, 1989, pgs. 343-376, archived @ Revistas.

1842 births
1901 deaths
19th-century Spanish painters
19th-century Spanish male artists
Spanish male painters
Painters from Catalonia
Orientalist painters
People from Barcelona
Spanish cartoonists
Spanish illustrators
Spanish war correspondents